The term alternative process refers to any non-traditional or non-commercial photographic printing process.  Currently the standard analog photographic printing process is the gelatin silver process, and standard digital processes include the pigment print, and digital laser exposures on traditional color photographic paper.  

Alternative processes are often called historical, or non-silver processes.  Most of these processes were invented over 100 years ago and were used by early photographers.

Many contemporary photographers are revisiting alternative processes and applying new technologies (the digital negative) and practices to these techniques.

Examples
Caffenol
Daguerreotype
Gum bichromate and other Pigmented Dichromated Colloids which are used to directly generate a photographic print
Platinum Process and Palladium Process
Carbon print and various similar processes which use a non-sensitive intermediate layer to generate a photographic image
Van Dyke Brown, Cyanotype and various other iron-based processes
Wet and Dry Plate processes based in silver using a hand coated emulsion on a tin or aluminum (tintype) or glass (ambrotype) base 
Resinotype and several similar processes which rely upon unexposed dichromated colloids to accept an insoluble pigment
Inkodye, a light-oxidized vat dye.
Oil pigment processes, such as bromoil process
Other processes which use silver halide but in various different ways other than the typical silver-gelatin formula, such as Salt Print
Any number of processes which use more exotic materials, such as uranium chloride, gold chloride, and any number of other salts to directly or indirectly generate a photographic print
Non standard digital manipulation or printing.

Learning

These schools and photography centers offer a variety of alternative process workshops and classes.

Alternative Processes Academy
The Image Flow
Maine Media
Penland School of Crafts
Santa Fe Workshops
Photographer's Formulary

See also
Photographic processes

Lo-fi photography

External links
 [https://www.alternativeprocesses.org/ - a platform with articles, interviews, tutorials and a global community built around Alternative Processes in photography
AlternativePhotography.com - a free information site on alternative photographic processes
Alternative Process Photography on Geotog.com

Photographic processes
Alternative photographic processes